Layton Greene  is an American singer and songwriter from East St. Louis, Illinois. She is signed to Quality Control Music and Universal Music Group. Her debut EP, Tell Ya Story, was released on September 9, 2019.

Greene is Quality Control Music's first R&B artist.

Early life 
Greene was born in East St.Louis, Illinois.  She was raised by her biological mother and her step father, who eventually separated when she was 14. Greene began singing at seven years old, reciting Keyshia Cole's "Love" to her mother.

Personal life 
Greene is in a relationship with music producer, GStylesOnTheTrack, who worked with her on “Open Wounds.” They had their first child together as of November 6, 2021.

Artistry 
Greene names Keyshia Cole, Aaliyah, and Chris Brown as her musical influences.

Discography

Compilation albums

Extended plays

Singles

References 

Living people
African-American women singer-songwriters
Singer-songwriters from Illinois
1998 births
People from East St. Louis, Illinois
21st-century African-American people
21st-century African-American women
American contemporary R&B singers
Alternative R&B musicians